Graphitic acid may refer to:

Graphite oxide
Mellitic acid